Antioquia is the Spanish form of Antioch.

Antioquia may also refer to:

 Antioquia Department, Colombia
 Antioquia State, Colombia (defunct)
 Antioquia District, Peru
 Antioquia Railway, in Colombia
 Antioquia University in Medellin, Colombia